Taty Sumirah (9 February 1952 – 13 February 2020) was a  badminton player of Indonesia.

Career 

Sumirah started her career by following the Asian Championships 1971 in Jakarta, she won a bronze medal after being defeated by Utami Dewi and get another bronze medal at the 1980 IBF World Championships after being defeated by  Verawaty Wiharjo in women's singles. Sumirah was a member of several Indonesian Uber Cup (women's international) teams, helping the 1975 team to win the world championship.

Achievements

World Championships 

Women's singles

Asian Championships 
Women's singles

International tournaments 
Women's singles

Women's doubles

Invitational tournaments 
Women's singles

References 

1952 births
2020 deaths
Sportspeople from Jakarta
Indonesian female badminton players
Badminton players at the 1974 Asian Games
Asian Games silver medalists for Indonesia
Asian Games medalists in badminton
Medalists at the 1974 Asian Games
20th-century Indonesian women